Kōjaku-in (香積院) is a Buddhist temple in Kawanayama-chō, Shōwa-ku, Nagoya, Aichi prefecture in central Japan.

The temple is associated with the production of Kawana ware during the Edo period.

References

External links 
 
 http://www.tokaitenrei.co.jp/hall/koujakuin.html 
 http://www.osohshiki.jp/area/aichi/nagoya-shi/showa-ku/sougijou-28067.html 
 https://4travel.jp/travelogue/10323618

Buddhist temples in Nagoya
Yagoto